Vyzantio Kokkinochoma F.C. is a Greek football club based in Kokkinochoma, Kavala.

The club was founded in 1947. They will play for 3rd year in Gamma Ethniki for the season 2015-16

External links
 http://www.byzantio-fc.com/

Football clubs in Eastern Macedonia and Thrace
Kavala (regional unit)